Joseph-König-Gymnasium is the only gymnasium in the Westphalian city of Haltern am See. With 1,360 students, it is one of the larger high schools in North Rhine-Westphalia. The school is named after the German chemist Joseph König. It continues tradition of 1844 founded 'Höhere Stadtschule' and later 'Städtisches Gymnasium Haltern'. It shares buildings with 'Alexander-Lebenstein-Realschule'.

On March 24, 2015, 16 of its students and two of its teachers were among the passengers murdered when the co-pilot of Germanwings Flight 9525 intentionally crashed into the French Alps. They were on their way home from a student exchange with the Giola Institute in Llinars del Vallès, Catalonia, Spain. Haltern's mayor, Bodo Klimpel, has described it as "the darkest day in the history of our city".

References

External links
  Joseph-König-Gymnasium

Educational institutions established in 1844
Schools in North Rhine-Westphalia
Gymnasiums in Germany